The Military ranks of Saint Kitts and Nevis are the military insignia used by the Saint Kitts and Nevis Defence Force.

Commissioned officers
The rank insignia for commissioned officers.

Other ranks
The rank insignia for NCOs and enlisted personnel.

References

Saint Kitts and Nevis
Ranks